Mikael Östberg (born 21 May 1977) is a Swedish cross-country skier. He competed in the men's sprint event at the 2006 Winter Olympics.

Cross-country skiing results
All results are sourced from the International Ski Federation (FIS).

Olympic Games

World Championships

World Cup

Season standings

Individual podiums
 1 victory – (1 ) 
 2 podiums – (2 )

Team podiums
 1 podium – (1 )

References

External links
 

1977 births
Living people
Swedish male cross-country skiers
Olympic cross-country skiers of Sweden
Cross-country skiers at the 2006 Winter Olympics
Sportspeople from Stockholm